Saratoga is an unincorporated community in Hardin County, Texas, United States. The ZIP code is 77585.

Saratoga is part of the Beaumont–Port Arthur Metropolitan Statistical Area.

Historical development
The original name for this community was New Sour Lake. The first significant landmark discovery of this area was the sulfur-smelling spring by J. F. Cotton in the 1850s. As late as 1865 he tried to establish an oil well on the site, but failed due to inadequate machinery.

In the 1880s a man named P. S. Watts wanted to profit from the spring using the unique "medicinal" properties of the water (a popular trend at the time). To draw would-be visitors to the site, Watts changed the name of the site to Saratoga to replicate the famous resort at Saratoga Springs, New York. He built a hotel and rental cottages for potential customers, but only a few came.

Years later, with the success of the Lucas Gusher within Spindletop at Beaumont, the first profitable wells would be drilled at Saratoga. In 1904 an extension of the Gulf, Colorado and Santa Fe Railway was built from Saratoga to Bragg Station. The railroad also created the business opportunity to profit from the lumber industry. The town's population would fluctuate from 1000 in 1925 down to 350 in the early 1950s and back to over 1000 in recent years. Although the Saratoga trunk line running north from the town was dismantled in 1934, new oil wells have been drilled as recently as the early 1990s.

Education
Saratoga is served by the West Hardin County Consolidated Independent School District.

Other information
 Saratoga is the birthplace of country music icon George Jones.
 At the southern edge of Saratoga is a large salt water marsh, created during the oil boom days of the town. Salt water was pumped from the many wells drilled around the town into this wide expanse and made desolate. Flint arrowheads and spearheads can still be discovered around the marsh from an ancient Indian population that once lived there.
 Saratoga also serves as the Big Thicket Association headquarters.

References

Unincorporated communities in Hardin County, Texas
Unincorporated communities in Texas
Beaumont–Port Arthur metropolitan area